A bitboard is a specialized bit array data structure commonly used in computer systems that play board games, where each bit corresponds to a game board space or piece. This allows parallel bitwise operations to set or query the game state, or determine moves or plays in the game.

Bits in the same bitboard relate to each other by the rules of the game, often forming a game position when taken together.  Other bitboards are commonly used as masks to transform or answer queries about positions.  Bitboards are applicable to any game whose progress is represented by the state of, or presence of pieces on, discrete spaces of a gameboard, by mapping of the space states to bits in the data structure.  Bitboards are a more efficient alternative board representation to the traditional mailbox representation, where each piece or space on the board is an array element.

Bitboards are especially effective when the associated bits of various related states on the board fit into a single word or double word of the CPU architecture, so that single bitwise operators like AND and OR can be used to build or query game states.

Among the computer game implementations that use bitboards are chess, checkers, othello and word games. The scheme was first employed in checkers programs in the 1950s, and since the mid-1970s has been the de facto standard for game board representation in computer automatons.

Description

A bitboard, a specialized bit field, is a format that packs multiple related boolean variables into the same machine word, typically representing a position on a board game, or state of a game.  Each bit represents a space; when the bit is positive, a property of that space is true.  Bitboards allow the computer to answer some questions about game state with one bitwise operation.  For example, if a chess program wants to know if the white player has any pawns in the center of the board (center four squares) it can just compare a bitboard for the player's pawns with one for the center of the board using a bitwise AND operation.  If there are no center pawns then the result will be all zero bits (i.e. equal to zero).  Multiple bitboards may represent different properties of spaces over the board, and special or temporary bitboards (like temporary variables) may represent local properties or hold intermediate collated results.

The efficacy of bitboards is augmented by two other properties of the implementation. First, bitboards are fast to incrementally update, such as flipping the bits at the source and destination positions in a  bitboard for piece location when a piece is moved.  Second, bitmaps representing static properties like all spaces attacked by each piece type for every position on a chessboard can be pre-collated and stored in a table, so that answering a question like "what are the legal moves of a knight on space e4?" can be answered by a single memory fetch.

Bitfield implementations take advantage of the presence of fullword (32-bit or 64-bit) bitwise logical operations like AND, OR, NOT and others on modern CPU architectures in order to be efficient. Bitboards may not be effective on earlier 8- and 16-bit minicomputer and microprocessor architectures.

Implementation issues
As a result of necessary compression and encoding of the contents of massive tables and the probability of transcription or encoding errors, bitboard programs are tedious for software developers to either write or debug.  Auxiliary generative methods not part of the application are usually required to build the tables.

Processor use

Pros
Bitboard representations use parallel bitwise operations available on nearly all CPUs that complete in one cycle and are fully pipelined and cached etc.  Nearly all CPUs have AND, OR, NOR, and XOR.  
Furthermore, modern CPUs have instruction pipelines that queue instructions for execution.  A processor with multiple execution units can perform more than one instruction per cycle if more than one instruction is available in the pipeline.  Normal instruction sequences with branches may cause the pipeline to empty if a branch is mispredicted. Many bitboard operations require fewer conditionals and therefore increase pipelining and make effective use of multiple execution units on many CPUs.

CPUs have a bit width which they are designed toward and can carry out bitwise operations in one cycle in this width.  So, on a 64-bit or more CPU, 64-bit operations can occur in one instruction.  There may be support for higher or lower width instructions.  Many 32-bit CPUs may have some 64-bit instructions and those may take more than one cycle or otherwise be handicapped compared to their 32-bit instructions.

If the bitboard is larger than the width of the instruction set, multiple instructions will be required to perform a full-width operation on it.  So a program using 64-bit bitboards would run faster on a 64-bit processor than on a 32-bit processor.

Cons
Bitboard representations have much longer code, both source and object code.  Long bit-twiddling sequences are technically tricky to write and debug.  The bitboards themselves are sparse, sometimes containing only a single one bit in 64, so bitboard implementations are memory-intensive.  Both these issues may increase cache misses or cause cache thrashing.

If the processor does not have hardware instructions for 'first one' (or 'count leading zeros') and 'count ones' (or 'count zeros'), the implementation will be significantly handicapped, as these operations are extremely inefficient to code as assembly language loops.

Cache and memory use

Pros
Bitboards require more memory than piece-list board data structures, but are more execution efficient because many loop-and-compare operations are reduced to a single (or small number of) bitwise operation(s). For example, in mailbox, determining whether piece attacks space requires generating and looping through legal moves of piece and comparing the final space with space.  With bitboards, the legal moves of piece are stored in a bitmap, and that map is ANDed with the bitmap for space.  A non-zero result means that piece attacks space.

Cons
For some games, writing a bitboard engine requires a fair amount of source code including data tables that will be longer than the compact mailbox/enumeration implementation. For mobile devices (such as cell phones) with a limited number of registers or processor instruction cache, this can cause a problem. For full-sized computers, it may cause cache misses between level-one and level-two cache. This is only a potential problem, not a major drawback, as most machines will have enough instruction cache for this not to be an issue.

Incremental update
Some kinds of bitboards are derived from others by an elaborate process of cross-correlation, such as the attack maps in chess.  Reforming all these maps at each change of game state (such as a move) can be prohibitively expensive, so derived bitmaps are incrementally updated, a process which requires intricate and precise code. This is much faster to execute, because only bitmaps associated with changed spaces, not all bitmaps over the board, need to change.  Without incremental update, bitmapped representation may not be more efficient than the older mailbox representation where update is intrinsically local and incremental.

Precomputed bitmaps and table lookup
Some kinds of bitmaps that don't depend on board configurations can be precomputed and retrieved by table lookup rather than collated after a move or state change of the board, such as spaces attacked by a knight or king located on each of 64 spaces of a chessboard that would otherwise require an enumeration.

Chess bitboards 
The obvious, and simplest representation of the configuration of pieces on a chessboard, is as a list (array) of pieces in a conveniently searchable order (such as smallest to largest in value) that maps each piece to its location on the board.  Analogously, collating the spaces attacked by each piece requires a serial enumeration of such spaces for a piece.  This scheme is called mailbox addressing. Separate lists are maintained for white and black pieces, and often for white and black pawns.  The maps are updated each move, which requires a linear search (or two if a piece was captured) through the piece list.  The advantage of mailbox is simple code; the disadvantage is linear lookups are slow.  Faster, but more elaborate data structures that map pieces to locations are called bitboards.

Standard

In bitboard representations, each bit of a 64 bit word (or double word on 32-bit architectures) is associated with a square of the chessboard.  Any mapping of bits to squares can be used, but by broad convention, bits are associated with squares from left to right and bottom to top, so that bit 0 represents square a1, bit 7 is square h1, bit 56 is square a8 and bit 63 is square h8.

Many different configurations of the board are usually represented by their own bitboards including the locations of the kings, all white pawns, all black pawns, as well as bitboards for each of the other piece types or combinations of pieces like all white pieces.  Two attack bitboards are also universal: one bitboard per square for all pieces attacking the square, and the inverse bitboard for all squares attacked by a piece for each square containing a piece.  Bitboards can also be constants like one representing the first rank, which would have one bits in positions 0 - 7.  Other local or transitional bitboards like "all spaces adjacent to the king attacked by opposing pieces" may be collated as necessary or convenient.

An example of the use of the bitboards would be determining whether a piece is  en prise: bitboards for "all friendly pieces guarding space" and "all opposing pieces attacking space" would allow matching the pieces to readily determine whether a target piece on space is en prise.

One of the drawbacks of standard bitboards is collating the attack vectors of the sliding pieces (rook, bishop, queen), because they have an indefinite number of attack spaces depending on other occupied spaces. This requires several lengthy sequences of masks, shifts and complements per piece.

Auxiliary bitboard representations 
In acknowledgement of the code size and computing complexity of generating bitboards for the attack vectors of sliding pieces, alternate bitboard data structures have been devised to collate them.  The bitboard representations of knights, kings, pawns and other board configurations is unaffected by the use of auxiliary bitboards for the sliding pieces.

Rotated  bitboards
Rotated bitboards are complementary bitboard data structures that enable tabularizing of sliding piece attack vectors, one for file attack vectors of rooks, and one each for the diagonal and anti-diagonal attack vectors of bishops (rank attacks of rooks can be indexed from standard bitboards).  With these bitboards, a single table lookup replaces lengthy sequences of bitwise operations.

These bitboards rotate the board occupancy configuration by 90 degrees, 45 degrees, and/or 315 degrees. A standard bitboard will have one byte per rank of the chess board. With this bitboard it's easy to determine rook attacks across a rank, using a table indexed by the occupied square and the occupied positions in the rank (because rook attacks stop at the first occupied square). By rotating the bitboard 90 degrees, rook attacks up and down a file can be examined the same way. Adding bitboards rotated 45 degrees and 315 degrees (-45 degrees) produces bitboards in which the diagonals are easy to examine. The queen can be examined by combining rook and bishop attacks.  Actually rotating a bitboard is an inelegant transformation that can take dozens of instructions.

Direct hashing
The rank and file attack vectors of rooks and the diagonal and anti-diagonal attack vectors of bishops can be separately masked and used as indices into a hash table of precomputed attack vectors depending on occupancy, 8-bits each for rooks and 2-8 bits each for bishops.  The full attack vector of a piece is obtained as the union of each of the two unidirectional vectors indexed from the hash table.  The number of entries in the hash table is modest, on the order of 8*2^8 or 2K bytes, but two hash function computations and two lookups per piece are required., see the hashing scheme employed.

Magic bitboards
Magic bitboards are an extrapolation of the time-space tradeoff of direct hashing lookup of attack vectors. These use a transmutation of the full attack vector as an index into the hash table.  Magic is a misnomer, and simply refers to the generation and use of a perfect hash function in conjunction with tricks to reduce the potential size of the hash table that would have to be stored in memory, which is 8*2^64 or 144 exabytes.  The first observation is that the outer squares or first and eighth ranks together with the 'a' and 'h' files are irrelevant to the occupancy of the attack vector: the piece attacks those squares or not (depending on other blocking pieces) regardless of occupancy, so these can be eliminated from consideration, leaving just 6x6 or 36 squares (~bits in the corresponding hash function). As with other schemes which require a perfect hashing function, an exhaustive process of enumeration, partly algorithmic and partly trial and error, is necessary to generate the hash function.  But the intractable issue remains: these are very active tables, and their size (fewer than a million entries in most cases) is huge relative to the lower level cache sizes of modern chip architectures, resulting in cache flooding.  So magic bitboards in many applications provide no performance gain over more modest hashing schemes or rotated bitboards.

History
The bitboard method for representing a board game appears to have been invented in the mid-1950s, by Arthur Samuel and was used in his checkers program.
For the more complicated game of chess, it appears the method was independently rediscovered later by the Kaissa team in the Soviet Union in the late 1960s, and again by the authors of the U.S. Northwestern University program "Chess" in the early 1970s.  The 64-bit word length of 1970s super computers like Amdahl and Cray machines, facilitated the development of bitboard representations which conveniently mapped the 64-squares of the chessboard to bits of a word.

Rotated bitboards for collating the moves of sliding pieces were invented by Professor Robert Hyatt, author of Cray Blitz and Crafty chess engines, sometime in the mid-1990s and shared with the Dark Thought programming team. They were later implemented in Crafty and Dark Thought, but the first published description wasn't until 1997.

A decade later, direct lookup methods using masked ranks, files and diagonals to index a table of attack vectors depending on occupancy states of bits under the mask, were introduced.  One such scheme utilizing a perfect hash function to eliminate hash collisions, was termed "magic bitboards".  Nonetheless, the large size and high access rates of such tables caused memory occupancy and cache contention issues, and weren't necessarily more efficacious than the rotated bitboard approach.
Today, game programs remain divided, with the best scheme being application dependent.

Other games
Many other games besides chess benefit from bitboards.

 In Connect Four, they allow for very efficient testing for four consecutive discs, by just two shift + AND operations per direction.
 In the Conway's Game of Life, they are a possible alternative to arrays.
 Othello/Reversi (see the Reversi article).

See also
 Board representation (chess)

Notes

References

Further reading
 http://people.csail.mit.edu/heinz/dt/node2.html

External links

Calculators
 64 bits representation and manipulation

Checkers
 Checkers Bitboard Tutorial by Jonathan Kreuzer

Chess

Articles
 Bitboards - Chessprogramming wiki
 Programming area of the Beowulf project
 Laramee, Francois-Dominic.  Chess Programming Part 2: Data Structures.
 Verhelst, Paul. Chess Board Representations
 Hyatt, Robert. Chess program board representations
 Frayn, Colin. How to implement bitboards in a chess engine (chess programming theory)
 Pepicelli, Glen. Bitfields, Bitboards, and Beyond  - (Example of bitboards in the Java Language and a discussion of why this optimization works with the Java Virtual Machine  (www.OnJava.com publisher: O'Reilly 2005))
 Magic Move-Bitboard Generation in Computer Chess. Pradyumna Kannan

Code examples
  The author of the Frenzee engine had posted some source examples.
  A 155 line java Connect-4 program demonstrating the use of bitboards.

Implementations

Open source 
 Beowulf Unix, Linux, Windows.  Rotated bitboards.
 Crafty  See the Crafty article.  Written in straight C.  Rotated bitboards in the old versions, now uses magic bitboards. 
 GNU Chess  See the GNU Chess Article.
 Stockfish UCI chess engine ranking second in Elo as of 2010
 Gray Matter C++, rotated bitboards.
 KnightCap GPL.  ELO of 2300.
 Pepito C. Bitboard, by Carlos del Cacho. Windows and Linux binaries as well as source available.
 Simontacci Rotated bitboards.

Closed source
 DarkThought Home Page

Othello
 A complete discussion of Othello (Reversi) engines with some source code including an Othello bitboard in C and assembly.
 Edax (computing)  See the Edax article. An Othello (Reversi) engine with source code based on bitboard.

Word games
 Overview of bit board usage in word games.

Game artificial intelligence
Digital tabletop games
Computer chess
Bit data structures